15094 Polymele  is a primitive Jupiter trojan from the Greek camp, approximately  in diameter. It is a target of the Lucy mission with a close flyby planned to occur in September 2027. It was discovered on 17 November 1999, by astronomers with the Catalina Sky Survey at Mount Lemmon Observatory, Arizona, in the United States. The P-type asteroid has a rotation period of 5.9 hours and highly elongated shape. It was named after Polymele from Greek mythology, the wife of Menoetius and the mother of Patroclus.

Orbit and classification 
Polymele is a Jupiter trojan asteroid orbiting in the leading Greek camp at Jupiter's  Lagrangian point, 60° ahead of the Gas Giant's orbit (see Trojans in astronomy). It orbits the Sun at a distance of 4.7–5.7 AU once every 11 years and 9 months (4,289 days; semi-major axis of 5.17 AU). Its orbit has an eccentricity of 0.09 and an inclination of 13° with respect to the ecliptic. The asteroid's observation arc begins 48 years prior to its official discovery observation at Mount Lemmon, with a precovery taken at Palomar Observatory in 1951, and published by the Digitized Sky Survey later on.

Naming 
This minor planet was named after Polymele, the daughter of Peleus from Greek mythology. According to the Latin author Gaius Julius Hyginus ( 64 BC – AD 17), she is the wife of the Argonaut Menoetius and the mother of Patroclus, who participated in the Trojan War. Polymele is also known as "Philomela"; that name was previously used for the asteroid 196 Philomela. The approved naming citation was published by the Minor Planet Center on 22 February 2016.

Lucy mission target 
Polymele is planned to be visited by the Lucy spacecraft which launched in 2021.

Physical characteristics 
Polymele has been characterized as a primitive P-type asteroid by the investigators of the Lucy mission. P-type asteroids are known for their low albedo. It has a V–I color index of 0.799, which is lower than that for most larger Jupiter trojans (see table below).

Diameter and albedo 
According to the survey carried out by the NEOWISE mission of NASA's Wide-field Infrared Survey Explorer, Polymele measures 21.075 kilometers in diameter and its surface has an albedo of 0.091, while in 2018, Marc Buie published an albedo of 0.073 and an absolute magnitude of 11.691 in the S- and/or R band. The Collaborative Asteroid Lightcurve Link assumes a standard albedo for a carbonaceous asteroid of 0.057 and calculates a larger diameter of 26.64 kilometers based on an absolute magnitude of 11.6.

Lightcurves 

In March 2016, a rotational lightcurve of Polymele was obtained from photometric observations by Marc Buie and colleges. Lightcurve analysis gave a rotation period of  hours with a small brightness amplitude of  magnitude, which indicates the body is being viewed pole-on. Previously, the Lucy mission team published spin rates of 6.1 and 4 hours, respectively.

Satellite 

Following observations of an occultation on 26 March 2022, the Lucy mission team reported the discovery of a satellite around Polymele. It will not be assigned a formal name until further observations determine its orbit. The Lucy team refers to the companion by the temporary informal name "Shaun," after Aardman Animations' animated sheep.

References

External links 
 Asteroid Lightcurve Database (LCDB), query form (info )
 Dictionary of Minor Planet Names, Google books
 Discovery Circumstances: Numbered Minor Planets (15001)-(20000) – Minor Planet Center
 
 

015094
015094
Named minor planets
015094
19991117